São Francisco de Itabapoana is a municipality located in the Brazilian state of Rio de Janeiro. Its population was 42,210 (2020) and its area is 1,111 km².

See also
Itabapoana River

References

Populated coastal places in Rio de Janeiro (state)
Municipalities in Rio de Janeiro (state)